Endless Love (Endless Love – ) is a 2019 Thai television series adaptation of the 2010 Taiwanese drama of the same title "Endless Love", starring Thanat Lowkhunsombat (Lee) and Violette Wautier.

Directed by Ekkasit Trakulkasemsuk and produced by GMMTV together with Keng Kwang Kang, the series was one of the thirteen television series for 2019 launched by GMMTV in their "Wonder Th13teen" event on 5 November 2018. It premiered on GMM 25 and LINE TV on 11 August 2019, airing on Sundays at 20:10 ICT and 22:00 ICT, respectively. The series concluded on 17 November 2019.

Cast and characters 
Below are the cast of the series:

Main 
 Thanat Lowkhunsombat (Lee) as Day
 Violette Wautier as Min

Supporting 
 Sutthipha Kongnawdee (Noon) as Ne
 Sarocha Burintr (Gigie) as Namol
 Sivakorn Lertchuchot (Guy) as Phon
 Nachat Juntapun (Nicky) as Cue
 Santisuk Promsiri (Noom) as Theep
 Teerapong Leowrakwong (Bie) as Pairoj
 Suttatip Wutchaipradit (Ampere)
 Kalaya Lerdkasemsap (Ngek)
 Weerayut Chansook (Arm)
 Phurikulkrit Chusakdiskulwibul (Amp)
 Suporn Sangkaphibal

Guest role 
 Trakarn Punthumlerdrujee

Soundtracks

References

External links 
 Endless Love on GMM 25 website 
 Endless Love on LINE TV
 GMMTV

Television series by GMMTV
Thai romance television series
Thai drama television series
2019 Thai television series debuts
2019 Thai television series endings
GMM 25 original programming
Television series by Keng Kwang Kang